Lismore is an electoral district of the Legislative Assembly in the Australian state of New South Wales. It is represented by Janelle Saffin of the Labor Party.

The electoral district includes all of the City of Lismore (including  Lismore, Lindendale, Nimbin, Dunoon and Clunes), much of inland Tweed Shire (including  Murwillumbah, Tyalgum and Uki), all of Kyogle Council (including Kyogle, Bonalbo, Tabulam and Woodenbong) and all of Tenterfield Shire. (including Tenterfield, Drake, Jennings, Liston, Legume, Torrington and Urbenville)

History
Lismore was first created with the end of multi-member districts in 1894, when it was split from Richmond.  In 1904, it was abolished with the reduction in the size of the Legislative Assembly, after Federation.  In 1913, Lismore was recreated, replacing Richmond.  With the introduction of proportional representation in 1920, Lismore and Clarence were absorbed into Byron.  With the end of proportional representation in 1927, Lismore and Clarence were recreated.

Historically a Country Party/National Party seat, Lismore has only been represented by two Labor MPs: Keith Compton, who was elected at a by-election in 1959 and re-elected in 1962, and Janelle Saffin, who was elected in 2019 who is also the first woman to represent the division.

Members for Lismore

Election results

References

Lismore